Bruno the bear may refer to:

 Bear JJ1, a European brown bear who made the news in 2006
 Bruno (bear actor), a trained American black bear who played Gentle Ben
 Name of the Brown Bears, mascot of Brown University
 A character on the TV series Edward and Friends
 A character in the cartoon Big Top Bunny